Lambas is a rural locality (a settlement) in Gorkovskoye Rural Settlement of Verkhnetoyemsky District, Arkhangelsk Oblast, Russia. The population was 242 as of 2010. There are 4 streets.

Geography 
Lambas is located on the Pinega River, 89 km northeast of Verkhnyaya Toyma (the district's administrative centre) by road.

References 

Rural localities in Verkhnetoyemsky District